The Henderson Hens was a primary moniker of the minor league baseball teams based in Henderson, Kentucky in various seasons between 1896 and 1916. Henderson teams played  as members of the Kentucky–Indiana League and Pennyrile League in 1896, Central League in 1897 and Kentucky–Illinois–Tennessee League (1903–1905, 1911–1914, 1916). Henderson hosted minor league games at Fairgrounds Park.

Today, Henderson hosts the Henderson Flash, a summer collegiate baseball team.

History
Minor league play in Henderson, Kentucky began in 1896, with the team playing in two leagues. The Henderson team began the season in the Pennyrile League, which folded and then restarted on June 22, 1896, as the Kentucky–Indiana League. Henderson had a 9–15 record in the Kentucky–Indiana League when the team disbanded on August 3, 1896. The league folded shortly after, with Henderson finishing 6.0 games behind the 1st place Madisonville. The Henderson managers were Phil Reccius and Coleman.

In 1897, Henderson resumed minor league play during the season. On June 13, 1897, Henderson became members of the Class C level Central League when the Nashville, Tennessee based team transferred to Henderson with a 21–18 record. The Central League permanently disbanded on July 20, 1897, with Henderson in 2nd place. The Nashville/Henderson team finished with a 39–31 overall record, ending the season 1.5 games behind the 1st place Evansville Brewers.

In 1903, the Henderson Blue Birds became charter members of the eight–team Class D level Kentucky–Illinois–Tennessee League, which became known informally as the KITTY League. In the first season of play in the new league, the Blue Birds finished with a 48–60 record in the final standings. Henderson placed 4th, finishing 19.0 games behind the 1st place Cairo Egyptians, playing under manager Peter Webber.

The Henderson Blue Birds returned to play and again finished 4th in the 1904 Kentucky–Illinois–Tennessee League. Henderson compiled a record of 54–68 under manager Clyde McNutt. The Blue Birds finished 19.5 games behind the 1st place Paducah Indians in the final standings.

In 1905, the Henderson Hens continued Kentucky–Illinois–Tennessee League play, but folded during the season. On July 18, 1905, the Hens had a record of 29–47 under managers Jake Zimbro and Hary Kubitz when the franchise folded  The league then halted play on August 17, 1905, due to the Yellow Fever epidemic.

The Henderson Hens rejoined the 1911 Kentucky–Illinois–Tennessee League during the season. On June 20, 1911, the McLeansboro Miners, with a 19–15 record moved to Henderson. The Hens placed 3rd in the eight–team league with an overall record of 46–43. The team finished 12.0 games behind the 1st place Hopkinsville Hoppers. Miles Bradshaw and Stelle managed the McLeansboro/Henderson team in 1911.

The 1912 Hens finished 2nd in the Kentucky–Illinois–Tennessee League. With a record of 52–48, Henderson finished 17.5 games behind the 1st place Clarksville Rebels in the six–team league. Offa Neal and Ward Snyder managed the 1912 Hens. On July 21, 1912, Fred Ostendorf of Henderson pitched a no-hitter against the Cairo Egyptians. Ostendorf and Henderson won the game 2–0.

Continuing Kentucky–Illinois–Tennessee League play, the 1913 Henderson Hens finished with a record of 70–55. The team placed 4th in the standings under managers Dave Anderson and Ward Snyder. The Hens finished 9.0 games behind the champion Paducah Chiefs. On August 7, 1913, Henderson's Tom Rogers threw a no–hitter in a 1–0 Henderson victory over the Owensboro Distillers.

The 1914 Henderson Hens placed 3rd in the Kentucky–Illinois–Tennessee League. Under returning manager Ward Snyder, Henderson finished with a 64–58 record. The Hens finished 12.5 games behind the Cairo Egyptians in the six–team league. James Leach of the Hens threw a perfect game in a 7–inning win on August 29, 1914. Leach was victorious over the Cairo Egyptians 1–0. The Kentucky–Illinois–Tennessee did not return to play in the 1915 season.

In their final season of play, the 1916 Henderson Hens were in 2nd place when the Kentucky–Illinois–Tennessee League folded. The league disbanded August 4, 1916 with a record of 44–30 under manager Connie Walsh. Henderson finished 6.0 games behind the 1st place Clarksville Volunteers.

Henderson, Kentucky has not hosted another minor league team. Beginning in 2017, Henderson was home to the "Henderson Flash",  a collegiate summer baseball team, members of the Ohio Valley League.

The ballpark
The Henderson minor league teams were noted to have played home games at the Henderson Fairgrounds Park. The ballpark was located at the Henderson Fair Grounds, Fairgrounds Street and Fair Street, Henderson, Kentucky.

Timeline

Year–by–year record

Notable alumni

George Beck (1912)
Theodore Conover (1897)
Jerry D'Arcy (1912)
Pat Dillard (1897)
Charlie French (1905)
Frank Freund (1896)
Offa Neal (1913, MGR)
Fred Ostendorf (1912–1913)
Charlie Petty (1897)
Ollie Pickering (1913)
Frank Quinn (1905)
Phil Reccius (1896, MGR)
Tom Rogers (1913)
George Tomer (1913–1914)
Tink Turner (1913)
Connie Walsh (1916, MGR)

See also
Henderson Hens playersHenderson (minor league baseball) playersHenderson Centennials players

References

External references
Baseball Reference

Defunct minor league baseball teams
Defunct baseball teams in Kentucky
Professional baseball teams in Kentucky
Baseball teams disestablished in 1916
Kentucky-Illinois-Tennessee League teams
Baseball teams established in 1905
Henderson County, Kentucky
Henderson, Kentucky